LGBT (Lesbian, Gay, Bisexual and Transgender) holders of political offices in the Netherlands.

Cabinet

Current
 Kajsa Ollongren (D66)
 Deputy Prime Minister (2017-2022)
 Minister of the Interior and Kingdom Relations (2017-2022)
 Minister of Defence (since 2022)
Hanke Bruins Slot (CDA)
Minister of the Interior and Kingdom Relations (since 2022)
Rob Jetten (D66)
Minister for Climate and Enegry Policy (since 2022)
Mark Harbers (VVD)
 State Secretary of Justice and Security (2017–2019)
 Minister of Infrastructure and Water Management (since 2022)

Former
 Hein Vos (PvdA)
 Minister of Commerce and Industry (1945–1946)
 Minister of Transport (1946–1947)
 Minister of Public Works and Reconstruction (1946–1947)
 Minister of Transport and Water Management (1947–1948)
 Ien Dales (PvdA)
 State Secretary of Social Affairs and Employment (1981–1982)
 Minister of the Interior (1989–1994)
 Joop Wijn (CDA)
 State Secretary of Economic Affairs (2002–2003)
 State Secretary of Finance (2003–2006)
 Minister of Economic Affairs (2006–2007)
 Gerda Verburg (CDA)
 Minister of Agriculture, Nature and Food Quality (2007–2010)
 Jan Kees de Jager (CDA)
 State Secretary of Finance (2007–2010)
 Minister of Finance (2010–2012)

States General

Current
 House of Representatives
 Henk Nijboer (since 2012)
 Vera Bergkamp (since 2012)
 Speaker of the House (since 2021)
Raoul Boucke (since 2021)
Lisa van Ginneken (since 2021)
Alexander Hammelburg (since 2021)

Current
 Senate
Ruard Ganzevoort (since 2011)
Boris Dittrich (since 2009)

Former
 Senate
Hein Vos (1956–1968)
 Herman Tjeenk Willink (1987–1997)
President of the Senate (1991–1997)
 Annemarie Grewel (1995–1998)
 Bob van Schijndel (1999–2003)
 Eric Smaling (2007–2013)
 Peter Rehwinkel (2007–2009)
 House of Representatives
Hein Vos (1937–1945, 1946, 1948)
 Coos Huijsen (1972, 1976–1977)
 Peter Lankhorst (1981–1994)
 Jan Franssen (1982–1994)
 Ien Dales (1982–1987)
 Evelien Eshuis (1982–1986)
 Wim van de Camp (1986–2009)
 Anne Lize van der Stoel (1994–1998)
 Clemens Cornielje (1994–2005)
 Boris Dittrich (1994–2006)
 Peter Rehwinkel (1995–2002, 2002)
 Gerda Verburg (1998–2007, 2010–2011)
 Joop Wijn (1998–2002, 2003, 2006–2007)
 Boris van der Ham (2002–2012)
 Ger Koopmans (2002–2012)
 Krista van Velzen (2002–2010)
 Tofik Dibi (2006–2012)
 Jan Kees de Jager (2010)
 Sjoerd Potters (2012–2017)
 Eric Smaling (2013–2017)
 Matthieu Heemelaar (2009)
 Astrid Oosenbrug (2012-2017)
 Henk Krol (2012–2013, 2014-2021)

European Parliament

Current

Former
 Herman Verbeek – (1984–1986, 1989–1994)
 Dennis de Jong (2009-2019)
 Wim van de Camp (2009-2019)
 Kim van Sparretak (2019-)

Council of State

Current
 Jan Franssen (since 2014)

Former
 Hein Vos (1968–1972)
 Herman Tjeenk Willink (1997–2012)

King's and Queen's Commissioners

Current
 Arno Brok
 Friesland (since 2017)

Former
 Jan Franssen
 South Holland (2000–2013)
 Clemens Cornielje
 Gelderland (2005–2019)

Mayors

Current
 Jaap Nawijn
 Ouder-Amstel (2003–2007)
 Heemskerk (2007–2012)
 Hollands Kroon (since 2012)
 Frans Buijserd
 Aalburg (2003–2007)
 Nieuwkoop (since 2007)
 Toon Mans
 Hillegom (2003–2011)
 Castricum (since 2011)
 Peter Rehwinkel
 Naarden (2004–2009)
 Groningen (2009–2013)
 Zaltbommel (since 2017)
 Roland van Benthem
 Eemnes (since 2005)
 Sjoerd Potters
 De Bilt (since 2017)
 Joris Bengevoord
 Winterswijk (since 2017)
 Onno Hoes
 Maastricht (2010–2015)
 Haarlemmermeer (2017-2019)

Former
 Ien Dales
 Nijmegen (1987–1989)
 Ton Jansen
 Neerijnen (1988–2005)
 Jan Franssen
 Zwolle (1994–2000)
 Arno Brok
 Sneek (2003–2010)
 Dordrecht (2010–2017)
 Geert Dales
 Leeuwarden (2004–2007)
 Anne Lize van der Stoel 
 Teylingen (2013–2014)
 Ger Koopmans
 Stein (2013)
 Kajsa Ollongren
 Amsterdam (2017)

Party leaders

Former
 Peter Lankhorst – GreenLeft (1993–1994)
 Pim Fortuyn – Livable Netherlands (2001–2002) – Pim Fortuyn List (2002)
 Boris Dittrich – Democrats 66 (2003–2006)
 Rob Jetten - Democrats 66 (2017-2021)
 Henk Krol – 50PLUS (since 2016, 2012–2013)

Party chairs

Former
 Hein Vos – Labour Party (1953–1955, 1960–1961)
 Herman Verbeek – Political Party of Radicals (1977–1981)
 Pim Fortuyn – Pim Fortuyn List (2002)
 Herman Meijer – GreenLeft (2003–2006)
 Heleen Weening – GreenLeft (2012)

Party Board Members/Political Consultants
 Alfred Vierling – Centre Party – Centre Democrats
 Ed Sinke – People's Party for Freedom and Democracy
 Frits Huffnagel – People's Party for Freedom and Democracy

See also
 List of the first LGBT holders of political offices
 List of lesbian, gay, bisexual, or transgender firsts by year

References

Netherlands
 
Lists of Dutch politicians